A statue of Johannes Gutenberg by David d'Angers is installed on Place Gutenberg in Strasbourg, France.

References

External links
 

Johannes Gutenberg
Monuments and memorials in France
Outdoor sculptures in France
Sculptures of men in France
Bronze sculptures in France
Statues in France